The bilateral relations between Canada and the United Kingdom have yielded intimate and frequently-co-operative contact since Canada gained independence in 1931. Canada was previously self-governing since 1 July 1867, the date that became Canada's independence day.

Both are related by mutual migration, through shared military history, a shared system of government, the English language, the Commonwealth of Nations, and their sharing of the same head of state, . Despite the shared legacy, the two nations grew apart economically during the 20th century after the U.K. lost its position as Canada's largest trading partner to the United States during the 19th century.  However, that trend has been reversed somewhat in the 21st century as the two countries have been negotiating free trade. Both share a defence agreement, NATO, and frequently perform military exercises, together with Canada hosting the largest British Military Base outside the United Kingdom.

History 

 Canada was formed in 1867 as a dominion bringing together parts of the British Empire. The Canadian Confederation federated the British crown colonies of the Province of Canada, Province of New Brunswick, and the Province of Nova Scotia.  The history of relations between Canada and London, well into the 20th century, is the story of London's steadily increasing control and Canada's slow evolution towards full sovereignty.

Early stages

Newfoundland

From early colonial days London had close relations with areas that eventually became part of Canada.  Historians debate whether John Cabot in 1497 made landfall in Nova Scotia or in Newfoundland. Sir Humphrey Gilbert, with authorization from Queen Elizabeth I, landed in St. John's, in August 1583. He formally took possession of Newfoundland for England. In the Treaty of Utrecht (1713), Paris acknowledged London's ownership of Newfoundland, and London endorsed the rights of French fisherman to use the rich waters off the northern peninsula and the northeastern coast.

Nova Scotia and Quebec

The French first settled Nova Scotia in 1604. The island then saw a century and a half of warfare involving the French, English, Scottish and Dutch forces, as well as local indigenous elements. By 1763 London was in full control.  New Brunswick was formed in 1784 by partitioning Nova Scotia.

In 1759, Britain conquered New France and, after the Treaty of Paris (1763), began to populate the Province of Quebec with English-speaking settlers.

British North America

British governors had complete control of Quebec until the Constitutional Act of 1791, which created the first Canadian legislatures.  The weak bodies were still inferior to the governors until the granting of responsible government in 1848. With their new powers, the colonies chose to federate in 1867, creating a new state, Canada, with the new title of dominion.

The constitution of the new Canadian federation left foreign affairs to the Imperial Parliament, in Westminster, but the leaders of the federal parliament, in Ottawa, soon developed their own viewpoints on some issues, notably relations between the British Empire and the United States. Stable relations and secure trade with the United States were becoming increasingly vital to Canada, so much so that historians have said that Canada's early diplomacy constituted a "North Atlantic triangle".

Most of Canada's early attempts at diplomacy necessarily involved the "mother country." Canada's first (informal) diplomatic officer was Sir John Rose, who was sent to London by Canadian Prime Minister John A. Macdonald. George Brown was later dispatched to Washington by Prime Minister Alexander Mackenzie to influence British-American trade talks.

The British government desired to formalise Canada's representation abroad, rather than deal with so many informal lobbyists and so in 1880, Alexander Tilloch Galt became the first High Commissioner sent from a dominion to Britain.

In the Boer War, 1899–1902, Anglophone Canadians volunteered to fight for the empire in large numbers despite the lukewarm support of the Canadian government of Wilfrid Laurier, the Liberal prime minister. However, in 1903 when Britain sided with the United States during the Alaska boundary dispute, Canadians were shocked and outraged at London's betrayal.

Economically, Canadian governments were interested in free trade with the United States, but since that was difficult to negotiate and politically divisive, they became leading advocates of Imperial Preference, which met with limited enthusiasm in Britain.

World War I
At the outbreak of World War I, the Canadian government and millions of Canadian volunteers enthusiastically joined Britain's side, but the sacrifices of the war and the fact they were made in the name of the British Empire caused domestic tension in Canada and awakened a budding nationalism in Canadians. At the Paris Peace Conference, Canada demanded the right to sign treaties without British permission and to join the League of Nations. By the 1920s, Canada was taking a more independent stance on world affairs.

In 1926, the Balfour Declaration had Britain declare that it would no longer legislate for the dominions, which they were now fully-independent states with the right to conduct their own foreign affairs.  That was later formalised by the Statute of Westminster 1931.

World War II

Loyalty to Britain still existed, however, and during the darkest days of World War II for Britain, after the fall of France and before the entry of the Soviet Union and the United States as allies, Canada was Britain's main ally in the North Atlantic providing naval defence against German submarines.

Financial aid

The Billion Dollar Gift and Mutual Aid were two large programs to help finance the British war effort.  They were similar to the American Lend Lease program.

Due to its expenditure on war materiel, Britain lacked gold reserves and U.S. dollars, to pay for existing and future orders with Canadian industry. At the same time, following expansion, Canadian industry was dependent on British contracts and before the war had had a positive balance of trade with the UK but with the establishment of Lend-Lease the UK placed future orders with the US. The Billion Dollar Gift was given in January 1942, coupled with a C$700 million non-interest bearing loan, both anticipated to last just over a year. It did not last until the end of 1942. It was replaced in May 1943 with the "War Appropriation (United Nations Mutual Aid) Act, 1943" which provided for aid to the UK and the other Allies and lasted until the end of the war. The magnitude of these contributions made them one of Canada's greatest contributions to the war effort. The two grants totaled over C$3 billion.

Moreover, the Billion Dollar Gift triggered a strong unpopular reaction amongst Canadians, which was demonstrated particularly in Quebec. The rate at which the money was used was a key reason in creating this unpopular view, as well as the lack of funding that was provided to the other nations in the Commonwealth. The aftermath of the Gift led Canada's future funding to assist the Allies with an alternative approach; one that focused on loaning material goods instead of money. A further consequence led to a change in the British Commonwealth Air Training Plan and this enabled another Canadian loan of just over $1 billion for Britain, Canada, Australia and New Zealand to share.

In addition, Canada provided materiel and services, including food, ammunition, and raw materials, as well as corvettes, Park ships, and radar sets, most of which went to the Commonwealth; some, like radars, also went to the U.S. In 1943, Canada had the fourth-highest industrial production among the Allies, behind the U.S., the Soviet Union and Britain.

Canada also loaned $1.2 billion on a long-term basis to Britain immediately after the war; these loans were fully repaid in late 2006.

After the destruction that Germany had inflicted on Europe during the war, Canada's relative economic and military importance was at a peak in the late 1940s, just as Britain's was declining because of military and industrial exhaustion. Both were dwarfed by the new superpowers; however, policymakers in the United States, Britain, and Canada were eager to participate in a lasting military alliance to defend against the Soviet Union, which resulted in the creation of NATO in 1949.

Constitutional independence
The definitive break in Canada's loyalist foreign policy came during the Suez Crisis of 1956, when the Canadian government flatly rejected calls from the British government for support of the British, French, and Israeli invasion of Egypt.  Eventually, Canada helped the three to save face and to extract themselves from a public relations disaster.  The Canadian delegation to the United Nations, led by future Prime Minister Lester B. Pearson, proposed a peacekeeping force to separate the two warring sides and so he was awarded the Nobel Peace Prize.

Meanwhile, Canada's legal separation from Britain continued. Until 1946, Britain and Canada shared a common nationality code. The Canadian Citizenship Act 1946 gave Canadians a separate legal nationality from Britain. Canadians could no longer appeal court cases to the Judicial Committee of the Privy Council in London after 1949.

The final constitutional ties between the United Kingdom and Canada ended with the passing of the Canada Act 1982. An Act of the British Parliament passed at the request of the Canadian federal government to "patriate" Canada's constitution, ending the necessity for the country to request certain types of an amendment to the Constitution of Canada to be made by the British Parliament. The Act also formally ended the "request and consent" provisions of the Statute of Westminster 1931 about Canada whereby the British parliament had a general power to pass laws extending to Canada at the latter's request.

Formal economic relations between the two countries declined after Britain acceded to the European Economic Community in 1973. In both countries, regional economic ties loomed larger than the historical trans-Atlantic ones. In 1988, Canada signed a free trade agreement with the United States, which became the North American Free Trade Agreement (NAFTA) in 1994 with the addition of Mexico. NAFTA became the Canada-United States-Mexico Agreement (CUSMA) in 2020 with the completion of negotiations. In 2020 the United Kingdom left the European Union. Britain is the fifth largest overall foreign investor in Canada. In turn, Canada is the third-largest foreign direct investor in Britain.

Defence and security 

The two countries have a long history of close collaboration in military affairs. Canada fought alongside Britain and its Allies in World War I. Canadians of British descent, the majority of the country, gave widespread support by arguing that Canadians had a duty to fight on behalf of their Motherland. Indeed, Prime Minister Wilfrid Laurier, despite being French-Canadian, spoke for the majority of English-Canadians when he proclaimed: "It is our duty to let Great Britain know and to let the friends and foes of Great Britain know that there is in Canada but one mind and one heart and that all Canadians are behind the Mother Country." It fought with Britain and its allies again in World War II.
 
Until 1972, the highest military decoration awarded to members of the British and Canadian Armed Forces was the Victoria Cross, and 81 members of the Canadian military (including those from Newfoundland) and 13 Canadians serving in British units had been awarded the Victoria Cross. In 1993, Canada created its own Victoria Cross.

CFB Suffield in Alberta, Canada, the largest military base operated by the Canadian Armed Forces, has hosted the British Army's largest armoured training centre, British Army Training Unit Suffield since 1971. Historically, the British military has also either operated, or used a number of military facilities in Canada; with the Royal Air Force having previously trained its pilots at CFB Goose Bay from 1942 to 2005.

In modern times, both are members of the AUSCANNZUKUS military alliance including the Five Eyes intelligence-sharing alliance with the United States, Australia, and New Zealand. Both countries are members of NATO and participate in UN peacekeeping operations. Before 2011, both countries' main areas of defence co-operation were in Afghanistan, where they were involved in its dangerous southern provinces. Both have provided air power to the NATO-led mission over Libya.

Economic relations 
Despite Canada's long-term shift towards proportionally more trade with the United States, Canada–British trade has continued to grow in absolute numbers. Britain is by far Canada's most important commercial partner in Europe and, from a global perspective, ranks third, after the United States and China. In 2010, total bilateral trade reached over 27.1 billion Canadian dollars, and for the last five years, Britain has been Canada's second-largest goods export market. Britain is the third source of foreign direct investment (FDI) in Canada after the United States and the Netherlands, and Canadian companies invest heavily in Britain. In 2010, the two-way stock of investment stood at almost C$115 billion.

On 9 February 2011, the boards of the London Stock Exchange and the Toronto Stock Exchange agreed to a deal in which both holding companies for the stock exchanges would merge, creating a leading exchange group with the largest number of listed companies in the world, and a combined market capitalization of £3.7 trillion (C$5.8 trillion). The merger was ultimately cancelled on 29 June 2011 when it became obvious that TMX shareholders would not give the needed two-thirds approval.

During the 2000s and 2010s, Canada and Britain worked together on negotiations towards a Comprehensive Economic and Trade Agreement (CETA) between Canada and the European Union. The agreement has been ratified by the European Parliament and is provisionally in force since 2017. The UK left the European Union at the end of January 2020, but continued to participate in the EU's trade agreements during a transition period that ended on 31 December 2020. In November 2020, the UK and Canada agreed to continue to apply the terms of the EU-CA agreement to the UK-CA bilateral trade.

Tourism 
In 2004, about 800,000 British residents visited Canada, the second-largest source of tourists in Canada, after the United States. The same year, British visitors spent almost C$1 billion while visiting Canada. Britain was the third international destination for Canadian tourists in 2003, after the United States and Mexico, with some 700,000 visitors spending over C$800 million.

Migration 

From the conquest of New France to 1966, Britain remained one of Canada's largest sources of immigrants, usually the largest. Since 1967, when Canadian laws were changed to remove preferences that had been given to Britons and other Europeans, British migration to Canada has continued but at a lower level. When the constituent nations of the UK (England, Wales, Scotland, and Northern Ireland) are taken together, people of British ancestry still form Canada's largest ethnic group. In 2005, there were 579,620 UK-born people living in Canada, making up 1.9% of population of Canada.

Historically, Canadians have travelled to Britain to advance their careers or studies to higher levels than could be done at home. Britain acted as the metropole to which Canadians gravitated, but that function has largely been reduced as the Canadian economy and institutions have developed. The Office for National Statistics estimates that in 2009, 82,000 Canadian-born people were living in Britain. In 2012, that was the third-largest community in the Canadian diaspora, after Canadians in the United States, and Canadians in Hong Kong.

In recent years, there has been growing support for the idea of freedom of movement between Britain, Canada, Australia, and New Zealand, with citizens able to live and work in any of the four countries, like the Trans-Tasman Travel Arrangement between Australia and New Zealand. The CANZUK organisation is a large promoter of this community concept and often cites significant support across each Realm.

Diplomacy 

 
The contemporary political relationship between London and Ottawa is underpinned by a robust bilateral dialogue at the head-of-government, ministerial and senior officials levels. As Commonwealth realms, the two countries share a monarch, King Charles III, and are both active members within the Commonwealth of Nations. In 2011, British Prime Minister David Cameron gave a joint address to the Canadian Parliament, and in 2013, Canadian Prime Minister Stephen Harper addressed both Houses of the British Parliament.

Canada maintains a High Commission in London. (Additionally, the Government of Quebec maintains a representative office at 59 Pall Mall.) The United Kingdom, in turn, maintains a High Commission in Ottawa, along with Consulates-General in Toronto, Montreal, Calgary, and Vancouver. In recent years, Canada has sought closer Commonwealth cooperation, with the announcement in 2012 of joint diplomatic missions with the UK and of the intention of extending the scheme to include Australia and New Zealand, both of which share a head of state with Canada. In September 2012, Canada and the United Kingdom signed a Memorandum of Understanding on diplomatic co-operation, which promotes the co-location of embassies, the joint provision of consular services, and common crisis response. The project has been criticized by some Canadian politicians as giving the appearance of a common foreign policy and is seen by many in the United Kingdom as an alternative and counterweight to EU integration.

Opinion polls
In a 2019–2020 YouGov poll asking Britons their "favourite country", 80 per cent of respondents said they held positive opinions about Canada; the most of any country listed in the poll besides New Zealand, which also had 80 per cent of Britons say they held positive opinions of. A 2014 BBC World Service poll found that 85 per cent of Britons held a positive view on Canada's influence in the world; while 80 per cent of Canadians held a positive view on the UK's influence in the world.

In a Nanos Research opinion poll taken in 2019, more than 80 per cent of Canadians viewed the UK as a positive or somewhat positive partner for Canada; higher than any other country asked in the poll. Nanos Research conducted another survey asking the same question in 2021 and found similar results; with over 80 per cent of Canadians holding a positive or somewhat positive view of the UK, more than any other country asked in the poll. Other polling firms have also found Canadians viewed the UK positively. In a Research Co. opinion poll conducted in 2020, 78 per cent of Canadians said they held favourable views for the UK, higher than any country polled in the survey. Another 2020 poll taken by Angus Reid Institute found 83 per cent of Canadians held favourable views of UK, ahead of any other country in the poll.

Twinnings
Several communities in Canada and the UK share a twinned cities agreement with one another. They include:

  Bala, Gwynedd and  Bala, Ontario
  Blairgowrie and Rattray, Perth and Kinross and  Fergus, Ontario
  Comrie, Perth and Kinross and  Carleton Place, Ontario
  Coventry, West Midlands and  Cornwall, Ontario
  Coventry, West Midlands and  Granby, Québec
  Coventry, West Midlands and  Windsor, Ontario
  Edinburgh, Lothian and  Vancouver, British Columbia
  Halifax, West Yorkshire and  Halifax, Nova Scotia
  London, England and  London, Ontario
  Perth, Perth and Kinross and  Perth, Ontario
  Stirling, Stirlingshire and  Summerside, Prince Edward Island
  Truro, Cornwall and  Truro, Nova Scotia

Quotes 
 Canada's future first prime minister, John A. Macdonald, speaking in 1865, hoped that, if the Canadian colonies created a new federation, then Britain and Canada would have "a healthy and cordial alliance. Instead of looking upon us as a merely dependent colony, Britain will have in us a friendly nation, a subordinate, but still powerful people to stand by her in North America in peace or war."
 Speaking many years later at the beginning of the 1891 election (fought mostly over Canadian free trade with the United States), Macdonald said on 3 February 1891: "As for myself, my course is clear. A British subject I was born; a British subject I will die. With my utmost effort, with my latest breath, will I oppose the 'veiled treason' which attempts, by sordid means and mercenary proffers, to lure our people from their allegiance."

Country comparison

See also 

 History of Canadian foreign relations
 History of the foreign relations of the United Kingdom
High Commission of Canada in London
High Commission of the United Kingdom in Ottawa
List of High Commissioners from the United Kingdom to Canada
List of Canadian High Commissioners to the United Kingdom
North Atlantic triangle

References

Further reading

 Bannister, Jerry. "Canada as Counter-Revolution: The Loyalist Order Framework in Canadian History, 1750-1840." in Liberalism and Hegemony (U of Toronto Press, 2018) pp. 98–146.
 Bastien, Frédéric. The Battle of London: Trudeau, Thatcher, and the Fight for Canada's Constitution (Dundurn, 2014).
 Brownlie, Jarvis. "'Our fathers fought for the British': Racial Discourses and Indigenous Allies in Upper Canada." Histoire sociale/Social history 50.102 (2017): 259–284; regarding First Nations online.
 Buckner, Phillip Alfred. The transition to responsible government: British policy in British North America, 1815-1850 (1985).
 Carter, Sarah. Imperial plots: Women, land, and the spadework of British colonialism on the Canadian Prairies (U of Manitoba Press, 2016).
 Champion, Christian Paul. The Strange Demise of British Canada: The Liberals and Canadian Nationalism, 1964-68 (McGill-Queen's Press-MQUP, 2010).
 Dewar, Helen. "Canada or Guadeloupe?: French and British Perceptions of Empire, 1760–1763." Canadian Historical Review 91.4 (2010): 637–660. After winning the war Britain kept Canada and returned Guadeloupe island to France 
 Dilley, Andrew. Finance, politics, and imperialism: Australia, Canada, and the city of London, c. 1896-1914 (Springer, 2011).
 Fedorowich, Kent. "Directing the War from Trafalgar Square? Vincent Massey and the Canadian High Commission, 1939–42." Journal of Imperial and Commonwealth History 40.1 (2012): 87–117.
 Fedorowich, Kent. "Sir Gerald Campbell and the British high commission in wartime Ottawa, 1938-1940." War in history 18.3 (2011): 357–385.
 Godefroy, Andrew B. "For Queen, King and Empire: Canadians Recruited into the British Army, 1858-1944." Journal of the Society for Army Historical Research 87.350 (2009): 135–149. online
 Gough, Barry Morton. "Crown, Company and Charter: Founding Vancouver Island Colony, a Chapter in Victorian Empire Making." BC Studies: The British Columbian Quarterly 176 (2012): 9-54. online
 Hebert, Joel. "'Sacred Trust': Rethinking Late British Decolonization in Indigenous Canada." Journal of British Studies 58.3 (2019): 565–597.
 Kaufman, Will, and Heidi Slettedahl Macpherson, eds. Britain and the Americas: Culture, Politics, and History (3 vol 2005), 1157pp; encyclopedic coverage.
 Krikorian, Jacqueline D. et al. eds. Globalizing Confederation: Canada and the World in 1867 (University of Toronto Press, 201) online 
 Lyon, Peter, ed. Britain and Canada: Survey of a Changing Relationship (1976) online
 McCulloch, Tony. "A quiet revolution in diplomacy: Quebec–UK relations since 1960." American Review of Canadian Studies 46.2 (2016): 176-195 online.
 Martin, Ged. "Attacking the Durham Myth: Seventeen Years On." Journal of Canadian Studies 25.1 (1990): 39–59.
 Martin, Ged. Britain and the Origins of Canadian Confederation, 1837-67 (2001).
 Mercer, Keith. "Northern Exposure: Resistance to Naval Impressment in British North America, 1775–1815." Canadian Historical Review 91.2 (2010): 199–232.
 Messamore, Barbara Jane. Canada's Governors-General, 1847-1878: Biography and Constitutional Evolution (U of Toronto Press, 2006). online
 Parker, Roy. Uprooted: the shipment of poor children to Canada, 1867-1917 (2008) online
 Smith, Andrew. "Patriotism, self-interest and the 'Empire effect': Britishness and British decisions to invest in Canada, 1867–1914." Journal of Imperial and Commonwealth History 41.1 (2013): 59–80.

Canada–UK–USA

Brebner, John Bartlett. North Atlantic Triangle—The Interplay of Canada, the United States and Great Britain (1945), the classic statement. online review 
 Brebner, J. Bartlet. "A Changing North Atlantic Triangle". International Journal 3#4 (1948), pp. 309–319. online
 English, John Alan. "5. Not an Equilateral Triangle: Canada's Strategic Relationship with the United States and Britain, 1939-1945." in The North Atlantic Triangle in a Changing World (U of Toronto Press, 2019) pp. 147–183.
 Finlay, John L. ed. Canada in the North Atlantic triangle: two centuries of social change (Oxford UP, 1975) online.
 Haglund, David G. "The North Atlantic triangle revisited: (geo) political metaphor and the logic of Canadian foreign policy." American Review of Canadian Studies 29.2 (1999): 211–235.
 Jasanoff, Maya. Liberty’s Exiles: The Loss of America and the Remaking of the British Empire (2011), on 1780s.
 McCulloch, Tony. "The North Atlantic Triangle: A Canadian myth?." International Journal 66.1 (2011): 197–207.
 Mackenzie, Hector. "Delineating the North Atlantic triangle: The Second World War and its aftermath." The Round Table 95.383 (2006): 101–112.
 McKercher, Brian J.C., and Lawrence Aronsen, eds. The North Atlantic Triangle in a changing world: Anglo-American-Canadian relations, 1902-1956 (University of Toronto Press, 1996).

External links
Canada and the United Kingdom relations – canadainternational.gc.ca
Canada and the UK – gov.uk
British High Commission – British High Commission in Ottawa
Canadian High Commission – Canadian High Commission in London

 
United Kingdom
Bilateral relations of the United Kingdom
Relations of colonizer and former colony